The River Ray is a tributary of the River Cherwell in south east England.

The Ray's catchment area is sparsely populated, especially in its lower reaches as it flows through the Otmoor wetlands. In 1815 a channel was cut between Charlton-on-Otmoor and Oddington, known as the New River Ray, to divert much of the water flow around the northern and southern edge of Otmoor.

References

Ray
Rivers of Oxfordshire
Otmoor